John Bonar may refer to:
 John Bonar (set decorator)
 John Bonar (minister)